Don Collins is an American former basketball player.

Don Collins may also refer to:

Don Collins (baseball) (born 1952), American baseball player
Don Collins (bowls) (1927–2010), Australian lawn bowler
Don Collins, alleged raper of Robbie Middleton who attempted to murder him by dousing petrol on him and setting him on fire

See also
Don Collins Reed, American professor of ethics and history of philosophy
Donal Collins (died 2010), priest and teacher accused of alleged sexual abuse of pupils in his charge